Ballagascar is a monotypic genus of east African jumping spiders containing the single species, Ballagascar insularis. The genus was first described by G. N. Azarkina and C. R. Haddad in 2020, and it has only been found in Madagascar. The type species, Ballagascar insularis, was originally described under the name "Homalattus insularis".

See also
 Homalattus
 Colaxes
 List of Salticidae genera

References

Further reading

Monotypic Salticidae genera
Spiders of Madagascar